Forrest Tisdale "Tiz" Lothrop (June 16, 1924 – May 29, 2021) was an American football coach. Lothrop was the sixth head football coach at Dickinson State College—now known as Dickinson State University–in Dickinson, North Dakota, serving for three seasons, from 1953 to 1955, and compiling a record of 10–10.

Lothrop attended high school in Redfield, South Dakota and played college football at South Dakota State University in Brookings, South Dakota. In 1950, he was appointed head football coach at Beresford High School in Beresford, South Dakota.

He died in Lennox, South Dakota in May 2021 at the age of 96.

Head coaching record

College

References

1924 births
2021 deaths
Coaches of American football from South Dakota
Dickinson State Blue Hawks football coaches
High school football coaches in South Dakota
People from Redfield, South Dakota
Players of American football from South Dakota
South Dakota State Jackrabbits football players